The kuna was the currency of the Independent State of Croatia in the period between 1941 and 1945 during World War II. The word  means "marten" in Croatian and the same name is used for the modern Croatian kuna currency, which was later replaced with the euro. This kuna was subdivided into 100 banica. It was preceded and replaced by the Yugoslav dinar.

History

The Croatian kuna was introduced in the Independent State of Croatia (NDH) on 26 July 1941.

The kuna replaced the Yugoslav dinar at par and was fixed to the German Reichsmark (ℛℳ) with dual exchange rates, one fixed at 20 kuna = 1 ℛℳ, the other a state-stimulated rate of
31 December 1941 - 25.00 Kn = 1 ℛℳ
31 December 1942 - 37.50 Kn = 1 ℛℳ
31 December 1943 - 40.00 Kn = 1 ℛℳ
31 December 1944 - 80.00 Kn = 1 ℛℳ
6 May 1945 - 120.00 Kn = 1 ℛℳ

The kuna was withdrawn from circulation from 30 June to 9 July 1945 and replaced by the 1944 issue of the Yugoslav dinar at a rate of 40 kuna = 1 dinar.

Coins 

Zinc coins were issued in denominations of 1 and 2 kune in 1941, but only the 2 kune pieces are available today in appreciable numbers.

Banknotes 

Kuna banknotes were introduced by the government in 1941, in denominations of 10, 50, 100, 500 and 1000 kuna. These were followed in 1942 by notes for 50 banicas and 1 and 2 kunas. In 1943, the Croatian State Bank introduced 100, 1000 and 5000 kuna notes. The notes were printed in Germany by Giesecke & Devrient.

Competing issues
Notes were also issued by partisan groups. These included the Zagreb Government Region Anti-Fascist Authority (Oblasni narodno-oslobodilački odbor Zagrebačke oblasti) and the State Anti-Fascist Council for the National Liberation of Croatia  - ZAVNOH (Zemaljsko antifašističko vijeće narodnog oslobođenja Hrvatske).

The Zagreb Government Region issued notes for 500, 1000, 5000, 10,000 and 50,000 kunas. The ZAVNOH issued notes in 1943, denominated in both dinars and kunas, for 100, 500, 1000, 5000, 10,000 and 100,000 kunas/dinars. Notes for 100, 500 and 1000 liras were also issued without indication as to the value in kunas.

See also

 Croatian kuna

Modern obsolete currencies
Kuna
1941 establishments in Croatia
1945 disestablishments in Croatia
1940s economic history
Currencies of Croatia
Currencies of Yugoslavia